Rått & Romantiskt (2002) is the debut solo album of Scandinavian artist Anna-Maria Hallgarn with drummer Ola Norrman, and keyboardist Michael Jöback.

Hallgarn is best known as a Scandinavian actress. Her 2002 album debut Rått & Romantiskt as a solo singer of covers.  Inspired by philosophical  Ulf Lundell's lyrics, she recorded the album in Stockholm and toured with concerts around Sweden.

The album included the five-minute acoustic song Never Lonely (Aldrig så ensam) and the ballad For those who love (För dom som älskar).

Contributors are Anna-Maria Hallgarn, Bo Hülphers, Michael Jöback and Ola Norrman. Photo made by Lasse Stener and Ulf Hallgarn. Mastering made by Henrik Jonsson. Mixer: Gunnar Norden and Ulric Johansson. Musicians: Michael Jöback - Keyboard, Ola Norwegian - Percussion, Anna-Maria Hallgarn - Vocals, Michael Jöback - Vibraphone. Recording was made by Janne Hansson. Author of lyrics is Ulf Lundell.

Track listing

References

2002 debut albums